Black Dog Lake is a lake in Dakota County, in the U.S. state of Minnesota.

The lake was named for Black Dog, a Sioux Indian.

See also
List of lakes in Minnesota

References

Lakes of Minnesota
Lakes of Dakota County, Minnesota